The yellow-headed water monitor (Varanus cumingi), also commonly known as Cuming's water monitor, the Mindanao water monitor, and the Philippine water monitor,  is a  large species of monitor lizard in the family Varanidae. The species is endemic to the Philippines. It thrives in mangrove, forest and water margins in tropical refuges, where it feeds on birds, fishes, mammals, and carrion.

Taxonomy
V. cumingi was previously recognized as a subspecies of the water monitor (Varanus salvator), but since 2007 is acknowledged as a species in its own right.

Etymology
The specific name, cumingi, is in honor of English conchologist and botanist Hugh Cuming.

Geographic range
V. cumingi is found in the southern Philippines, where it is distributed on Mindanao and a few small nearby islands.

Description
V. cumingi has the highest degree of yellow coloration among all the endemic water monitors in the Philippines, probably even in the world. The V. cumingi is a large lizard and medium-sized monitor lizard.

Habitat
The preferred natural habitats of V. cumingi are mangroves and moist forest, but it is also abundant in artificial habitats such as fish ponds and cultivated lands.

Diet
The diet of V. cumingi is composed of rodents, birds, fishes, crustaceans, mollusks, and other invertebrates, including eggs and carrion.

Subspecies
Two subspecies were formerly recognized: V. c. cumingi occurring on Mindanao and offshore islands and V. c. samarensis on the islands of Bohol, Leyte and Samar. However, the latter has since been elevated to full species status as Varanus samarensis.

References

Further reading
Martin [WCL] (1839). "Remarks on two species of Saurian Reptiles". Proceedings of the Zoological Society of London 1838: 68–70. (Varanus cumingi, new species, pp. 69–70). (in English and Latin).

Varanus
Reptiles of the Philippines
Reptiles described in 1839
Taxa named by William Charles Linnaeus Martin